Gonocausta zephyralis is a moth in the family Crambidae. It was described by Julius Lederer in 1863. It is found on Ambon Island in Indonesia, Ecuador, Costa Rica and Honduras.

References

Moths described in 1863
Spilomelinae